There are four main types of airline-railway business alliance or codeshare agreements: dedicated services, entire network access, Night&Fly, and re-protection agreements. The currently active air-rail alliances are listed in the tables below.

Dedicated services 
Dedicated services are less common than Rail&Fly alliances, due to the level of service provided. Often checked through luggage to is provided between the air and rail journeys, dedicated carriages or entire trains are provided to airline passengers, and service is to the same level expected on board an aircraft, including meals and refreshments.

Entire network access 
More commonly referred to as Rail & Fly due to the popularity of the Deutsche Bahn service, entire network access is the increasingly common form of air-rail alliance. This allows passengers to book a discounted (sometimes free) train ticket in addition to their full-price air ticket. Checked through luggage and dedicated train compartments for airline passengers are not normally available, though sometimes first class train travel is provided. Travel is usually available to the entire rail network.

♯ Indicates airlines offer Rail&Fly ticketing on company website

Airline-Rail re-protection agreements 
Also known as "Good for Trains", this is an emergency backup service for airline cancellations, providing train tickets in lieu of flights to get passengers to their destination. Such an example was during the Eyjafjallajökull eruption in 2010, where extra trains were provided to support the airlines’ stranded passengers in Europe. These 'good for train' agreements are in place with the following airlines:

See also 

 List of IATA-indexed railway stations
 Codeshare agreement
 Airport rail link

References

External links 
 List of Rail&Fly partners from Frankfurt Airport 

Public transport by mode
Airline alliances
Airport rail links